Azal Tinto or Amaral is a variety of red Portuguese wine grape. It is planted in the Minho region where it is used in red Vinho Verde, while the related Azal Branco is used for white Vinho Verde.

Synonyms
Azal Tinto is also known under the synonyms Amaral, Amaral Preto, Azal, Azal Preto, Cachon, Cainho Miudo, Caino, Caino Bravo, Caino Tinto, Sousao, and Sousao Galego.

Azal Tinto is also used as a synonym for Vinhão.

See also
Azal Branco
List of Portuguese grape varieties

References

Red wine grape varieties